Albert Goodwin   (1845–1932) was a British landscapist specialising in watercolours. His work shows the influences of Turner and the Pre-Raphaelite Brotherhood.

Goodwin was born in Maidstone in Kent, the son of a builder and one of 9 children. After leaving school he became an apprentice draper. His exceptional artistic ability was recognised at an early age and he went on to study with the Pre-Raphaelite artists Arthur Hughes and Ford Madox Brown - the latter predicting that he would become "one of the greatest landscape painters of the age".

At the age of 15 his first painting was exhibited at the Royal Academy. He became an associate member of the Royal Watercolour Society (RWS) in 1876. He was championed by famed art critic John Ruskin who took him on a tour of Europe, where he made many sketches from nature which were later turned into watercolours. During his lifetime he traveled extensively throughout Britain and Europe, and visited many other countries including a trip to Canada in 1890 accompanied by his nephew and fellow artist Sidney Goodwin.

Goodwin was a prolific artist, producing over 800 works and continuing to paint well into his eighties. His wide variety of landscape subjects reflected his love of travel and show the influence of Turner, with whom he felt a strong affinity. In later works he developed experimental techniques such as using ink over water color to achieve atmospheric lighting effects. His works are also an important record of social history.

Gallery

References

Further reading
Ackerman, Gerald M. Les orientalistes de l'Ecole britannique pp102 ff. (ACR, 2010).
Goodwin, Albert. The Diary of Albert Goodwin RWS, 1893-1927 (privately published, 1934).
Wilcox, Scott & Newall, Christopher. Victorian landscape watercolors (Hudson Hills Press, 1992).

External links

Visual arts (BBC)
Albert Goodwin (The Victorian Web)
Visionary Landscapes (Maidstone Museum)

Artcyclopedia - Albert Goodwin
Chris Beetles (Art Gallery)
Tate Gallery
Manchester Art Gallery
Tyne & Wear Museums database
ArtMagick

19th-century English painters
English male painters
20th-century English painters
Landscape artists
1845 births
1932 deaths
English watercolourists
People from Maidstone
19th-century English male artists
20th-century English male artists